George H. Baker (November 1859 – December 23, 1928) was an American politician in the state of Washington. He served in the Washington State Senate and Washington House of Representatives. From 1905 to 1907, he was President pro tempore of the Senate. He died after undergoing surgery for peritonitis in 1928.

References

1859 births
1928 deaths
Republican Party Washington (state) state senators
Republican Party members of the Washington House of Representatives